Al Nahyaneia Model School is one of the first government-run schools built in the United Arab Emirates and the first in the city of Al Ain.  It was established by Sheikh Zayed Bin Sultan Al Nahyan in the city of Al Ain in 1959.

History 
Until the late 1950s, education generally took place at al-Katateeb. Under Sheikh Zayed Bin Sultan Al Nahyan, the decision was made to modernize the education system in the U.A.E. Al Nahyaneia Model School was one of the first schools built to achieve this goal.

Departments 
Al Nahyaneia Model School has approximately 650 students and 70 teachers.  The students are local Emirati boys.  Core subjects offered are: Arabic, Islamic Studies, Social Studies, English, Math and Science.  Non-core subjects include: Art, Music, Physical Education/Health Studies and Information Technology.  The school has a library, student cafeteria, gymnasium, computer labs, music rooms, science labs and art rooms.  There is a special education room and the school clinic has a full-time nurse.

References 

 United Arab Emirates by David C. King

External links 
 Abu Dhabi Education Council 
 Al Nahyaneia Model School for Basic Education
 U.A.E. Education Information

Schools in the United Arab Emirates